The 2018–19 New Orleans Privateers women's basketball team represented the University of New Orleans during the 2018–19 NCAA Division I women's basketball season. The Privateers were led by eighth year head coach Keeshawn Davenport and played their home games at the Lakefront Arena. They are members of the Southland Conference.

Previous season
The Privateers finished the 2017–18 season 15–15, 11–7 in Southland play to finish in a three way tie for fourth place. They lost in the first round of the Southland women's tournament to Abilene Christian.

Roster
Sources:

Schedule
Sources:

|-
!colspan=9 style=";"| Exhibition

|-
!colspan=9 style=";"| Non-conference regular season

|-
!colspan=9 style=";"| Southland regular season

|-
!colspan=9 style=";"| Southland Women's Tournament

See also
2018–19 New Orleans Privateers men's basketball team

References

New Orleans Privateers women's basketball seasons
New Orleans
New Orleans Privateers women's basketball team
New Orleans Privateers women's basketball team